Tuppy is a name. Notable people with this name include:

Surname
 Hans Tuppy (born 1924), Austrian biochemist

Given name
 Tuppy Diack (born 1930), New Zealand rugby union player
 Tuppy Ngintja Goodwin (born 1952)
 Tuppy Owen-Smith, South African cricket player
 Tuppy Owens, English sex therapist

Fictional characters
 Tuppy Glossop